This is a list of Serbian flags used in the past and present. For more information about the national flag, see the article Flag of Serbia.

Flag of Serbia

Provincial flags

Governmental flags

Military flags

Naval flags

Flags of municipalities and cities

Historical official flags

Medieval flags

Other flags

Political flags

See also

 List of Yugoslav flags
 List of flags of Montenegro
List of Serbian anthems

References 

 
 
 Still in some limited use

Sources

External links

List
Serbian culture
Serbia
Flags